Thalia is a genus of six currently recognized species found in aquatic or marshy habitats, ranging in Africa from Senegal to Sudan to Zimbabwe, and in the Americas from Illinois to Argentina. Alligator-flag is a common name for plants in this genus. The generic name is in honor of Johannes Thal (1542–1583), a German doctor who wrote a Flora of the Harz Mountains.

Cultivation 
Semihardy in cultivation, it needs protection against frosts. It can be propagated by seed or division of the rootstock in the spring.

Species 
Species:

 Thalia dealbata Fraser - southeastern United States
 Thalia densibracteata Petersen - Brazil
 Thalia geniculata L. -  Africa, Florida, Louisiana, tropical Americas
 Thalia multiflora Horkel ex Körn. - Argentina, Brazil, Uruguay
 Thalia pavonii Körn. - Ecuador
 Thalia petersiana K.Schum. in H.G.A.Engler (ed.) -  Brazil

References

External links 
International Plant Names Index
Kew Plant List
BBC Gardening Guide

 
Zingiberales genera
Flora of Africa
Flora of the United States
Flora of Mexico
Flora of Central America
Flora of South America
Flora of the Caribbean
Freshwater plants
Taxa named by Carl Linnaeus